Ruth Simpson may refer to:

 Ruth Simpson (activist) (1926–2008), author and founder of the United States' first lesbian community center
 Ruth Simpson (artist) (1889–1964), British artist
 Ruth DeEtte Simpson (1918–2000), American archeologist

See also
 Ruth Williams-Simpson (born 1949), Jamaican sprinter